The Royal Agricultural Benevolent Institution (R.A.B.I) is a registered charity that offers support, mostly financial, to farming people in hardship in England and Wales. It assists people of all ages, including the elderly, sick and disabled as well as those working in farming, including dependants.

History 
R.A.B.I was founded in 1860 by John Mechi, an Essex farmer and the son of an Italian businessman. His concern about poverty in the farming community led him to write to The Times to rally support for the formation of the institution. By 1860, he had received donations of 1,700 guineas and 450 pledges to make annual donations. Ironically, Mechi died poor. His affairs went into liquidation in 1880 and he died 12 days later, on Boxing Day, of encephalitis and ‘a broken heart’. In his last months the farmers of England subscribed £5,000 to help him out of insolvency but he died before he could benefit from it. The money – equivalent to £500,000 today – went to his family and included £200 from the Royal Bounty at the express wish of Prime Minister William Gladstone.

In 1935 King George V granted R.A.B.I a royal charter to mark its 75th anniversary. The charter was later amended in 1999 to extend the charity's support to farmworkers as well as farmers.

In 2001, an outbreak of Foot and Mouth disease among livestock in the UK caused a crisis in British farming and agriculture. During this time, R.A.B.I paid out around £9 million across the UK to more than 8,000 families.

Management 
R.A.B.I's patron is Queen Elizabeth II. The royal patronage has passed down succeeding monarchs from Queen Victoria. The current President of the institution is the Duke of Gloucester.

The charity is governed by a board of 12 trustees, who serve for four years but may be re-elected for a second term. Jeanette Dawson OBE is the chair of the board.

The chief executive of R.A.B.I is Alicia Chivers, who succeeded Paul Burrows in 2018.

Services 
R.A.B.I's primary service is providing grants to farming people in financial need. It offers regular payments to those from the agricultural industry needing long-term support; mostly people who are no longer working, are typically over 65 and have limited savings. One-off payments can also be given for other things such as essential white goods, heating or disability equipment and adaptations.

The charity also supports working individuals and families from the farming sector who are struggling financially.

As well as giving financial assistance, R.A.B.I can provide other support such as offering benefits advice, organising business appraisals and arranging debt advice.

Care homes 
The charity runs two residential care homes for elderly people, primarily with a background in agriculture.

Beaufort House is located in Burnham-on-Sea, Somerset. It has 33 en-suite rooms in the main house as well as 12 self-contained flats. Manson House is located in Bury St Edmunds, Suffolk. It has 31 en-suite rooms and 23 independent flats.

References 

Charities based in the United Kingdom
Agricultural organisations based in the United Kingdom
Organisations based in England with royal patronage
Organizations established in 1860
1860 establishments in England